One male athlete from Macedonia competed at the 1996 Summer Paralympics in Atlanta, United States.

See also
North Macedonia at the Paralympics
Macedonia at the 1996 Summer Olympics

References 

Nations at the 1996 Summer Paralympics
1996
Summer Paralympics